Abuna Aregawi (also called Za-Mika'el Aragawi) was a sixth-century Syrian monk and canonized by the Ethiopian Orthodox Tewahedo Church, as well as by the Ethiopian Catholic Church, as well as the Eritrean Orthodox Church. He is one of the Nine Saints, who came from the Roman Empire to Ethiopia, and are credited for founding many monasteries and churches and was the main force behind installing monasticism in Ethiopia  

Tradition holds that Abuna Aregawi founded the monastery Debre Damo in Tigray Region of Ethiopia, which is said to have been commissioned by Emperor Gebre Mesqel of Axum.

Biography
He is one of the Nine Saints of the Ethiopian Orthodox Church. These learned monks came from various parts of the Roman Empire to escape persecution after the Council of Chalcedon (451). Once in Ethiopia, they revitalized Christianity in Ethiopia, and to whom the Ge'ez version of the New Testament is attributed. Besides Abba Aregawi, the Nine Saints included Abba Aftsé, Abba 'Aléf, Abba Gärima, Abba Guba, Abba Liqanos, Abba Pantelewon, Abba Sehma, and Abba Yäm'ata (Yemata).

Aregawi was a disciple of the famous Coptic monk Pachomius the Great who is regarded a founder of Cenobitic Monasticism.

After spending twelve years at the court of king Ella Amida of Axum, he set out with his companion, the nun Edna, to found Debre Damo. Later in his life, king Kaleb is said to have sought his advice before setting out to south Arabia against the Jewish king Dhu Nuwas.

Debre Demo monastery
According to legend, God provided a large snake to aid Aregawi in climbing the amba, or steep-sided mountain, so he could build Debre Damo in Tigray. As David Buxton recounts the story, "when Abba Aragawi, the founder of the monastery, came to the foot of the cliff a great serpent appeared. As Michael the Archangel stood by to give directions, the serpent folded Abba Aregawi in his coils and drew him to the top of the mountain." 

The monastery is built with curved wood panels, painted ceilings and walls dedicated to the legend of Abuna Aregawi. Many books have been written there and distributed to churches throughout Ethiopia. There are a collection of some of the best manuscripts presently existing in Ethiopia. 

His feast day is on Ṭəqəmt 14 in the Ethiopian calendar (24 or 25 October in Gregorian calendar).

References

Further reading

External links
 Painting on cotton showing Saint Aregawi ascending to Debra Damo on the tail of a snake.

Syrian monks
Adigrat
Ethiopian saints
6th-century Christian saints
Christian missionaries in Ethiopia